Lorenzo João Gordinho (born 26 April 1994) is a South African professional footballer who plays as a centre-back for Cape Town City and the South Africa national team.

An academy graduate of Chiefs, Gordinho made his senior professional debut in 2013 and, either side of a year-long loan at Bloemfontein Celtic in 2018, represented the club on 71 occasions. Two years later, he joined fellow PSL side Bidvest Wits. He signed for Danish side Viborg FF in the summer of 2020

Gordinho is also a full international with South Africa, having made his senior debut in 2017, and has to date earned three caps with the national team.

Club career

Early career
Gordinho is the son of former Orlando Pirates and Benoni United player, Manny Faria. In his early years, he and his brother Anthony played for Easterns in Benoni and later in Balfour, before being invited to train with Orlando Pirates’ development team. From there Gordinho was signed by Kazier Chiefs at the age of 15 after being put into contact with development coach, Lucky Stylianou by close friend Masalealo Seanego. His brother later trialled in Brazil before joining Ajax Cape Town's academy.

Kaizer Chiefs

Having progressed through the club's academy, Gordinho made his Kaizer Chiefs debut in the 2013–14 PSL season under coach Stuart Baxter. He made only two appearances across all competitions the following season as the club claimed a domestic double, winning the PSL and MTN 8 titles. Following Baxter's departure, and Steve Komphela's arrival in 2015, he was chosen to be part of the club's captains committee and became a regular within the starting line-up. He was voted PSL Player of the Month for August and September 2016. In January 2017, Gordinho was one of four Chiefs players who travelled to England to train with Fulham as part of a relationship-building exercise between the two clubs. Later that month, he was invited to trial with Danish Superliga side AaB and featured for the side in a friendly against Hoffenheim. A permanent move failed to materialize, however, and upon his return to South Africa he signed a new three-year contract with Chiefs. On 31 October 2017, he made his 50th league appearance for the club. It was his final appearance for Kaizer Chiefs for the season, however, and in January the following year he joined fellow PSL side Bloemfontein Celtic on loan.

Loan to Bloemfontein Celtic

On 3 January 2018, Gordinho signed for Bloemfontein Celtic on a one-year loan as part of a deal which saw Celtic captain Kabelo Mahlasela join Kaizer Chiefs permanently. He made his debut four days later when he started in a 2–1 league win over Golden Arrows and was well received by the club's supporters who were recorded chanting his name throughout the match. On 4 March, he earned the man of the match award for his performance in Celtic's 1–0 league win over Ajax. He scored his first goal for the club exactly one month later, netting in a 2–1 defeat to Orlando Pirates. He was also later sent off during the match for a professional foul on Luvuyo Memela. He ultimately made 16 appearances across all competitions in his debut season with the club. Ahead of the following season, he was reunited with Komphela after the manager had taken over the club following Veselin Jelušić's resignation and his own sacking by Chiefs earlier in the year. He made 14 appearances during the first half of the 2018–19 campaign before returning to Chiefs, despite Celtic attempting to retain his services for the remainder of the season.

Bidvest Wits

Following his return to Naturena, Gordinho managed just eight appearances over the course of the next year, before securing a permanent move to PSL rivals, Bidvest Wits on 14 January 2020, where he signed a two-and-a-half-year deal.

Viborg FF
After opting not to move to Tshakhuma Tsha Madzivhandila, who had purchased the top-flight status of Bidvest Wits, he signed a two-year contract with Danish side Viborg FF on a free transfer. As his contract came to an end in June 2022, Gordinho left the club after making a total of 15 appearances for Viborg since his arrival.

HB Køge
On 1 July 2022, Gordinho signed a 1,5-year deal with Danish 1st Division side HB Køge.

International career
Though born in Benoni, South Africa, Gordinho was eligible to represent Portugal prior to making his international debut as his father is Portuguese.

South African national football team
In March 2017, Gordinho received his first call-up to the South African national side by interim-coach Owen Da Gama before making his debut under Stuart Baxter in a 2–1 friendly loss to Zambia in June.

Career statistics

Club

1 Includes Nedbank Cup matches. 
2 Includes Telkom Knockout matches. 
4 Includes MTN 8 matches.

International

Honours

Club
Kaizer Chiefs
Premier Soccer League: 2014–15

Viborg
Danish 1st Division: 2020–21

Individual
 PSL Player of the Month (2): August 2016; September 2016

References

1996 births
Living people
People from Benoni
South African soccer players
Association football defenders
Kaizer Chiefs F.C. players
Bloemfontein Celtic F.C. players
Viborg FF players
HB Køge players
Danish 1st Division players
South African Premier Division players
South African expatriate soccer players
Expatriate men's footballers in Denmark
South African expatriate sportspeople in Denmark
South Africa international soccer players
South African people of Portuguese descent
Sportspeople from Gauteng